The 2012–13 Vermont Catamounts men's basketball team represented the University of Vermont during the 2012–13 NCAA Division I men's basketball season. The Catamounts, led by second year head coach John Becker, played their home games at Patrick Gym and were members of the America East Conference. They finished the season 21–12, 11–5 in America East play to finish in a tie for second place. They advanced to the championship game of the America East tournament where they lost to Albany. They were invited to the 2013 College Basketball Invitational where they lost in the first round to Santa Clara.

Roster

Schedule

|-
!colspan=9| Exhibition

|-
!colspan=9| Regular season

|-
!colspan=9|2013 America East tournament

|-
!colspan=9| 2013 College Basketball Invitational

References

Vermont Catamounts men's basketball seasons
Vermont
Vermont
Cat
Cat